This is a list of marketing research firms. In the case of research groups or conglomerates the location of the headquarters of the parent entity is given.

Australia
 OzTAM
 Roy Morgan Research

Belgium
 EyeSee Research

Canada
 Abacus Data
 Léger Marketing
 Print Measurement Bureau

China
 JETT customer experience

France
 Ipsos
 MKG Group

Germany
 GfK
 Psyma Group

India
 IMRB International
 RNB Research

Turkey
 Eksen Research

United Kingdom
 Datamonitor
 Dunnhumby
 Euromoney
 Ipsos MORI
 Kantar Group
 Mintel
 NUS Services
 Progressive Digital Media
 Research International
 Survation
 Synovate
 Taylor Nelson Sofres (part of the Kantar Group)
 YouGov

United States
 Arbitron
 Decision Analyst
 Forrester Research
 Frost & Sullivan
 Gartner Group
 Hall & Partners
 Harris Interactive
 IMS Health
 International Data Corporation
 IRI
 J. D. Power and Associates
 KS&R
 NPD Group
 Nielsen
 Rockbridge Associates, Inc.
 StrategyOne
 Survata

References

Marketing
Market research
Marketing-related lists